Following is a list of justices of the Supreme Court of Alabama.

Current justices

Chief justices

Associate justices

References

External links
Alabama Appellate Justices and Judges, Past and Present
A History of the Alabama Judicial System: Supreme Court
Alabama Supreme Court and State Law Library: Judges

Alabama